Love 24x7 is a 2015 Indian Malayalam romantic comedy film written and directed by debutante Sreebala K Menon starring Dileep and debutante Nikhila Vimal in lead roles while Sreenivasan, Suhasini, Sashi Kumar and Lena plays the supporting roles. Mukesh R Mehta and Dileep co-produced the film for E4 Entertainment in association with Graand Production. The music was composed by Bijibal while lyrics were written by Rafeeq Ahmed. The film released on Ramadan day, 18 July 2015.

Synopsis
Roopesh, a media executive, falls in love with Kabani, a trainee who works her way up to become a news presenter. The story also focuses on the love story of two old ex lovers who became separated due to their careers. We see history repeating itself with Roopesh and Kabani both becoming stars of their separate channels.

Cast
 Dileep as Roopesh Nambiar
 Nikhila Vimal as Kabani ""Karthika""
 Sreenivasan as Ummar Abdullah
 Suhasini as Dr. Sarayu
 Sashi Kumar as Dr. Satheesh
 Lena as Jayashree
 Anjali Nair as Nandhini
 Sudhi Koppa as Joshy
 Nandhini Sree as Soya Sreedharan
 Sidhartha Siva as Anthony
 Manju Pillai as Jessica Moses (Kabani's mother)
 Alancier Ley Lopez as Kabani's uncle
 Shankar Ramakrishnan as Murali Gopalakrishna Pillai
 Abhija Sivakala as Swetha Pillai
 Fara Shibila
 Saran Puthumana
 Dinesh Prabhakar
 Thesni Khan
 Idavela Babu
 Santhosh Pandit
 Krishna Praba as Nimisha
 Moly Kannamali 
 Pauly Valsan as Canteen person

Production
It is the first independent film of Kerala Sahitya Akademi Award winning writer Sreebala K Menon, who was the former associate of director Sathyan Anthikad in five of his films. Sreebala, initially penned the script, started it as the plot for a short story, but later weaved into a feature film with some changes. About the media-oriented theme, Sreebala says, "In Malayalam we have seen stories revolving around the life of reporters, the risks they take and  the drama happening, both in the print and visual media. But what happens behind the camera, the normal life of news presenters, who in themselves are celebrities these days, are not explored much. Love 24x7 delves into those things."

The filming wrapped up in the last week of June 2015.

Soundtrack
Music: Bijibal, Lyrics: Rafeeq Ahamed

 "Venal Ozhiyunu" - Ganesh Sundaram, Sithara Krishnakumar
 "Veyilarum" - Minmini

References

External links
 

2015 films
2010s Malayalam-language films